Diomedes Antonio Olivo Maldonado (January 22, 1919 – February 15, 1977), nicknamed "Guayubin" for his hometown, was a Dominican professional baseball player and scout. He was the brother of fellow major leaguer Chi-Chi Olivo, and the father of major league pitcher Gilberto Rondón.

Career
Prior to his minor league and Major League career, Olivo spent many years playing in his native Dominican Republic. Diomedes Olivo posted a 55–29 win–loss record in the Double-A Mexican League from 1955–1959, then made his Major League debut with the Pirates at age 41 on September 5, 1960. His age at the time of his MLB debut is the oldest with the exception of Satchel Paige in the post-World War II era. In his first game, he pitched two scoreless innings of relief against the Milwaukee Braves, allowing one hit (to eventual Hall of Famer Eddie Mathews) and two bases on balls.

At age 43, he worked in 62 games, all but one in relief, and posted a 5–1 record and 2.77 earned run average in  innings pitched, with seven saves. He retired at age 44 following that season.

During his MLB career, Olivo allowed 112 hits and 39 bases on balls in  innings pitched, striking out 85.

He scouted for the Cardinals after retiring from the field, and later held a position in the Ministry of Sports in his native country until his death, from a heart attack, at age 58.

References

Further reading

Articles
 Biederman, Les. Bucs Add Reliefer From Mexico; Vet Diomedes Olivo To Join Roy Face In Pirate Bullpen". The Pittsburgh Press. March 7, 1960.
 Abrams, Al. "Sidelights On Sports: 'Where You Been, Diomedes?'". The Pittsburgh Post-Gazette. April 8, 1962.
 Dozer, Richard. "42-Year-old Rookie Beats Cubs, 6-5". The Chicago Tribune. April 17, 1962. pp. 41, 42
 Biederman, Les. "Olivo Saves Another Pirate Win: Rookie, 42, Helps Friend in Ninth To Beat Cards, 5-4". The Pittsburgh Press. June 1, 1962.
 Clark, Bill. "Olivo No-Hits Toronto, 1-0". The Atlanta Constitution. pp. 29, 30

Books
 Bjarkman, Peter C. (2005). Diamonds Around the Globe: The Encyclopedia of International Baseball. Westport, CN: Greenwood Press.  pp. 166-167, 180-181. .

External links

Diomedes Olivo at (Baseball BioProject)

1919 births
1977 deaths
Atlanta Crackers players
Columbus Jets players
Diablos Rojos del México players
Dominican Republic expatriate baseball players in Mexico
Dominican Republic expatriate baseball players in the United States
Havana Sugar Kings players

Major League Baseball pitchers
Major League Baseball players from the Dominican Republic
Mexican League baseball pitchers
Petroleros de Poza Rica players
Pittsburgh Pirates players
St. Louis Cardinals players
St. Louis Cardinals scouts
Expatriate baseball players in Cuba